George Henry Boulter (July 17, 1825 – January 18, 1894) was an Ontario physician and political figure. He represented Hastings North in the Legislative Assembly of Ontario as a Conservative member from 1867 to 1883.

He was born in Prince Edward County in Upper Canada in 1825. He studied at Victoria College in Cobourg and McGill College and graduated as a M.D. He served as a major in the local militia. He was reeve of Stirling and warden for Hastings County. He died at Stirling in 1894.

The geographical township of Boulter in Nipissing District and the community of Boulter in the Township of Carlow/Mayo in Hastings County were named after him.

References

External links 

The Canadian parliamentary companion and annual register, 1878, CH Mackintosh

1825 births
1894 deaths
Mayors of places in Ontario
People from Prince Edward County, Ontario
Progressive Conservative Party of Ontario MPPs